Hits is a compilation album by American pop-punk band New Found Glory, released on March 18, 2008 on Geffen Records.

The album includes eleven of their most famous songs and one b-side. The first track, "Situations", was written for an MTV promotion, but was never used. In June 2007, the band decided to release it through AbsolutePunk.net to promote their appearance on that year's Warped Tour. The booklet contains a written introduction by Chad Gilbert and is filled with photographs from the band's personal archives. The cover art depicts boxer Jack Johnson's defeat of James Jeffries.

Track listing

Bonus tracks

Credits
 Jordan Pundik – lead vocals
 Chad Gilbert – backing vocals, lead guitar
 Steve Klein – rhythm guitar, lyrics
 Ian Grushka – bass guitar
 Cyrus Bolooki – drums, percussion

References

External links

Hits at YouTube (streamed copy where licensed)

2008 greatest hits albums
New Found Glory albums
Geffen Records compilation albums